We Are Family is a 2010 Indian family drama film directed by Siddharth Malhotra and produced by Hiroo Yash Johar and Karan Johar under Dharma Productions, with Sony Pictures Entertainment and UTV Motion Pictures handling the distribution rights. The film features Kajol, Kareena Kapoor and Arjun Rampal in the lead roles, and is an official Indian adaptation of Stepmom (1998), starring Susan Sarandon, Julia Roberts and Ed Harris. 

We Are Family was originally scheduled for release on 10 September 2010, but was rescheduled to release on 3 September to avoid clashing with the Salman Khan-starrer Dabangg. It proved to be an underwhelming success at the box office. However, it received positive reviews from critics upon release, with particular praise directed towards Kajol and Kapoor's performances.

At the 56th Filmfare Awards, Kapoor won Best Supporting Actress for her performance in the film.

Plot
Maya is a former book publisher and a perfect mother whose life revolves around her three children, Aaliya, Ankush, and Anjali. Despite being divorced from Aman, Maya has ensured that they remain a happy family unit. However, things take an unexpected turn when Aman's girlfriend, Shreya Arora, a career-oriented fashion designer with a lot to learn about children, joins the family.
 
When Aman introduces Shreya at Anjali's birthday party, she accidentally drops Anjali's birthday cake, which leads the children to perceive her as evil and they name her “dayaan” which means witch. Aman who was supposed to have the children for the day, tells Shreya to look after them as he is busy with a meeting. The same day, at a fashion show, Anjali helps Shreya with one of the outfits for the models. When Shreya goes to get ice cream for the children, Aaliya tells her siblings that she is using them so she can take their father away, and Anjali goes missing after. At the police station, Anjali is found and Aman tells Shreya that she cannot go near the children without Maya's permission after Maya rebukes him and threatens to file a lawsuit. 

Maya finds out that she has cervical cancer and tells Aman, which prompts him to move back in with the family and leave Shreya. However, he is unable to forget her, which Maya notices. Maya tells their children that she has cancer and Aaliya retaliates by going to a party with an older boy. Maya then tells Shreya that she has cancer, and tells her she wants her to take care of the kids after she's gone, as they'll need a mother in their lives. Shreya refuses at first, not believing herself to be the ‘mom type,’ but agrees to move in and leave her career. In the following days, the children develop an attachment towards Shreya but when Maya and Shreya have an argument, it is revealed that Shreya is an orphan since birth, thus she was never taught anything about being a mother. After the argument, Aman tells Maya that they should not be competing with each other for the children's love and he rebukes Maya. Maya faints and is brought to the hospital, where the doctor tells her that she has only a few days left. Shreya decides to take care of the children while Aman tends to Maya.

When Shreya and the children go to visit Maya at the hospital, the two women have a private conversation. Shreya admits that the children need their real mother, not her. Maya bequeaths guardianship of the children to Shreya and confesses a mistake she made that almost killed Anjali years ago due to recklessness. She explains to Shreya that not every mother is perfect but that she needs to keep trying. Maya tells Aman she wants to return home for Diwali as the last chance to see her house before she dies. During the festival, the children hold a special event for her, replaying the memories they had together. When they take a family photograph, Maya asks Shreya to join, as she is now family. Soon after, Maya dies. Aman has married Sherya, and she became the children's stepmother. 

Ten years later, it is Aaliya's wedding and Shreya decks her up as her mother. She gifts her a bracelet which belonged to Maya. Shreya speaks to the family photo and says that Maya was right in that she eventually became the mom type. During the marriage rounds, Shreya looks at the sky and recalls Maya saying she had the children's yesterday while Shreya has their tomorrow, and smiles.

Cast
Kajol as Maya: Aman's ex wife, Aaliya, Ankush and Anjali's mother 
Kareena Kapoor as Shreya Arora: Aman's girlfriend turned wife, Aaliya, Ankush and Anjali's step-mother  
Arjun Rampal as Aman: Shreya's husband, Maya's ex-husband, Aaliya, Ankush and Anjali's father
Aanchal Munjal as Aaliya: Aman and Maya's eldest daughter, Shreya's step-daughter 
Nominath Ginsberg as Ankush: Aman and Maya's only son, Shreya's step-son
Diya Sonecha as Anjali: Aman and Maya's youngest daughter, Shreya's step-daughter 
 Iravati Harshe as Dr. Rati Malhotra: Maya's doctor 
Amrita Prakash as elder Aaliya (cameo)
 Ankit Malik as elder Ankush (cameo)
 Dingy Vira as elder Anjali (cameo)

Production
Karan Johar decided to adapt Stepmom for the Indian audience with a working title Love You Maa. Although he initially intended to buy the rights to the film, he eventually opted to co-produce it with Sony Pictures.

The film was shot in Sydney, Australia and Mumbai from November 2009 to April 2010. According to Siddharth Malhotra, several scenes involving racial prejudice against the children were cut to avoid the appearance of using the controversy over violence against Indians in Australia to promote the film.

Soundtrack

The album has six original songs composed by Shankar–Ehsaan–Loy and lyrics by Irshad Kamil and Anvita Dutt Guptan, including a tribute to Elvis Presley's "Jailhouse Rock".

 "Ankhon Mein Neendein" – Rahat Fateh Ali Khan & Shreya Ghoshal (5:02)
 "Dil Khol Ke Let's Rock" – Anushka Manchanda, Akriti Kakkar & Suraj Jagan (03:57)
 "Reham O Karam" – Vishal Dadlani & Shankar Mahadevan (05:47)
 "Hamesha & Forever" – Sonu Nigam & Shreya Ghoshal (04:51)
 "Sun Le Dua Yeh Aasmaan (Theme Slow Version)" – Bela Shende (03:53)
 "We Are Family (Theme)" – (02:48)

Release 
We Are Family's teaser trailer was released along with I Hate Luv Storys, which released on 2 July 2010.

The film was originally scheduled for release on 10 September 2010, but was rescheduled to release on 3 September to avoid clashing with the Salman Khan-starrer Dabangg.

Reception

Critical response
Upon release, We Are Family received positive reviews from critics, with particular praise directed towards Kajol and Kapoor's performances. IANS rated the film 4 out of 5 saying, We Are Family is equally appealing from the outside and at the heart". The Hindustan Times gave it two out of five stars. India Today's reviewer glibly stated, "Kajol cries, Kareena cries, the kids cry, and even Rampal sheds an artful tear. We weep for the loss of two hours."

Box office performance
The film grossed about ₹27 million on opening day and collected a total of ₹205 million at the end of its second week. At the end of its theatrical run, it grossed ₹220 million and was eventually declared "average". We Are Family performed well overseas, particularly in the UK. The movie was declared a "semi-hit" by Box Office India.

Awards & nominations

56th Filmfare Awards

Won 

 Best Supporting Actress – Kareena Kapoor

References

External links
 
 
 

2010s Hindi-language films
2010 films
Indian remakes of American films
Films shot in Sydney
Films shot in Mumbai
Films scored by Shankar–Ehsaan–Loy
UTV Motion Pictures films
Hindi remakes of English films
Sony Pictures films
Columbia Pictures films
Sony Pictures Networks India films